Quintus Pompeius Rufus:
 Quintus Pompeius Rufus (consul 88 BC)
 Quintus Pompeius Rufus (son-in-law of Sulla)